Ectemnius dives is a species of square-headed wasp in the family Crabronidae. It is found in Europe and Northern Asia (excluding China), North America, and Southern Asia.

References

Crabronidae
Articles created by Qbugbot
Insects described in 1835